In mathematics, a Padé approximant is the "best" approximation of a function near a specific point by a rational function of given order. Under this technique, the approximant's power series agrees with the power series of the function it is approximating.  The technique was developed around 1890 by Henri Padé, but goes back to Georg Frobenius, who introduced the idea and investigated the features of rational approximations of power series.

The Padé approximant often gives better approximation of the function than truncating its Taylor series, and it may still work where the Taylor series does not converge. For these reasons Padé approximants are used extensively in computer calculations. They have also been used as auxiliary functions in Diophantine approximation and transcendental number theory, though for sharp results ad hoc methods— in some sense inspired by the Padé theory— typically replace them. Since Padé approximant is a rational function, an artificial singular point may occur as an approximation, but this can be avoided by Borel–Padé analysis.

The reason why the Padé approximant tends to be a better approximation than a truncating Taylor series is clear from the viewpoint of the multi-point summation method. Since there are many cases in which the asymptotic expansion at infinity becomes 0 or a constant, it can be interpreted as the "incomplete two-point Padé approximation", in which the ordinary Padé approximation improves the method truncating a Taylor series.

Definition
Given a function f and two integers m ≥ 0 and n ≥ 1, the Padé approximant of order [m/n] is the rational function

 

which agrees with f(x) to the highest possible order, which amounts to
 

 

When it exists, the Padé approximant is unique as a formal power series for the given m and n.

The Padé approximant defined above is also denoted as

Computation
For given x, Padé approximants can be computed by Wynn's epsilon algorithm and also other sequence transformations from the partial sums

of the Taylor series of f, i.e., we have

f can also be a formal power series, and, hence, Padé approximants can also be applied to the summation of divergent series.

One way to compute a Padé approximant is via the extended Euclidean algorithm for the polynomial greatest common divisor. The relation

is equivalent to the existence of some factor  such that

Recall that, to compute the greatest common divisor of two polynomials p and q, one computes via long division the remainder sequence

For the Bézout identities of the extended greatest common divisor one computes simultaneously the two polynomial sequences

to obtain in each step the Bézout identity

For the [m/n] approximant, one thus carries out the extended euclidean algorithm for

and stops it at the last instant that  has degree n or smaller.

Then the polynomials  give the [m/n] Padé approximant. If one were to compute all steps of the extended greatest common divisor computation, one would obtain an anti-diagonal of the Padé table.

Riemann–Padé zeta function
To study the resummation of a divergent series, say

 
it can be useful to introduce the Padé or simply rational zeta function as

where

is the Padé approximation of order (m, n) of the function f(x). The zeta regularization value at s = 0 is taken to be the sum of the divergent series.

The functional equation for this Padé zeta function is

where aj and bj are the coefficients in the Padé approximation. The subscript '0' means that the Padé is of order [0/0] and hence, we have the Riemann zeta function.

DLog Padé method
Padé approximants can be used to extract critical points and exponents of functions. In thermodynamics, if a function f(x) behaves in a non-analytic way near a point x = r like , one calls x = r a critical point and p the associated critical exponent of f. If sufficient terms of the series expansion of f are known, one can approximately extract the critical points and the critical exponents from respectively the poles and residues of the Padé approximants , where .

Generalizations
A Padé approximant approximates a function in one variable.  An approximant in two variables is called a Chisholm approximant (after J. S. R. Chisholm), in multiple variables a Canterbury approximant (after Graves-Morris at the University of Kent).

Two-points Padé approximant
The conventional Padé approximation is determined to reproduce the Maclaurin expansion up to a given order. Therefore, the approximation at the value apart from the expansion point may be poor. This is avoided by the 2-point Padé approximation, which is a type of multipoint summation method. At , consider a case that a function  which is expressed by asymptotic behavior :

  

 

As a result, at the point , where the accuracy of the approximation may be the worst in the ordinary Padé approximation, good accuracy of the 2-point Padé approximant is guaranteed.

There is a method of using this to give an approximate solution of a differential equation with high accuracy. Also, for the nontrivial zeros of the Riemann zeta function, the first nontrivial zero can be estimated with some accuracy from the asymptotic behavior on the real axis.

Multi-point Padé approximant 
A further extension of the 2-point Padé approximant is the multi-point Padé approximant. This method treats singularity points  of a function  which is to be approximated. Consider the cases when singularities of a function are expressed with index  by

 

As a result, since the information of the peculiarity of the function is captured, the approximation of a function  can be performed with higher accuracy.

Examples

Jacobi 

Bessel 

Fresnel

See also
Padé table
Bhaskara I's sine approximation formula

References

Literature
 Baker, G. A., Jr.; and Graves-Morris, P.  Padé Approximants.  Cambridge U.P., 1996.
 Baker, G. A., Jr. Padé approximant, Scholarpedia, 7(6):9756.
 Brezinski, C.; Redivo Zaglia, M. Extrapolation Methods. Theory and Practice.  North-Holland, 1991. 
 .
Volume 1881, Issue 90, Pages 1–17.
 Gragg, W. B.; The Pade Table and Its Relation to Certain Algorithms of Numerical Analysis [SIAM Review], Vol. 14, No. 1, 1972, pp. 1–62.
(3), 9, 1892, pp. 1–93 supplement. 

 .

External links
 
 Padé Approximants, Oleksandr Pavlyk, The Wolfram Demonstrations Project.
 Data Analysis BriefBook: Pade Approximation, Rudolf K. Bock  European Laboratory for Particle Physics, CERN.
 Sinewave, Scott Dattalo, last accessed 2010-11-11.
 MATLAB function for Padé approximation of models with time delays.

Continued fractions
Numerical analysis
Rational functions